Physica may refer to:

 Physics (Aristotle)
 Physica (journal), a Dutch scientific journal
 Physica A
 Physica B
 Physica C
 Physica D
 Physica E
 Physica Scripta, an international scientific journal for experimental and theoretical physics